Crayford was a local government district in north west Kent from 1920 to 1965 around the town of Crayford. As well as Crayford, it included Barnehurst, Barnes Cray and Slade Green.

It was created an urban district in 1920 from part of Dartford Rural District. It acquired an early 20th century building that had been used by Vickers as a canteen and converted it into Crayford Town Hall in 1929.

In 1965 it was abolished by the London Government Act 1963 and its former area was combined with that of other districts to form the London Borough of Bexley.

References

External links
A Vision of Britain - Crayford UD

Crayford
History of the London Borough of Bexley
History of local government in London (1889–1965)
Urban districts of England